Busker Busker  is a South Korean indie band who rose to fame through their runner-up performance in the South Korean music audition television program Superstar K3 on Mnet. The band consists of guitarist and vocalist Jang Beom-june, bassist Kim Hyung-tae and drummer Brad Moore.

Busker Busker 1st Album and its single "Cherry Blossom Ending" were released in March 2012. The band's six-month contract with CJ E&M came to an end in 2012, and they then joined Chungchun Music, releasing Busker Busker 2nd Album in September 2013. In December 2013, they announced they had temporarily disbanded yet the members have repeatedly hinted at a reunion.

Career

Before Superstar K3 
The group Busker Busker was founded by the band's guitarist and lead singer, Jang Beom-jun. His vision was to create a busking art group that focused on street performances and sought to bring an artistic cultural presence to the streets of Korea. His vision included all art mediums, not just music, and he sought to create festivals that would showcase the budding talents of local artists. Members of Busker Busker included university students, mostly from the Cheonan campus of Sangmyung University. Prior to Brad Moore joining the band, the band's name was Pinky Pinky and was only a subset of the total Busker Busker group. The band's drummer had to leave the band in order to keep his compulsory commitment to join the South Korean Army.

At that time, Jang and Kim Hyung-tae were both university students at Sangmyung University where Moore also worked as an English instructor. They met and the three became the new bandmates, renaming the band Busker Busker. However, the band was still a loose formation, as many members of the Busker Busker group would rotate in and out of band performances. The Busker Busker group set up multiple performances in the summer of 2011 in a local Cheonan park, which is where the Busker Busker band's fame began to escalate. At the same time, Jang, Kim, and Moore were participating in the Superstar K3 auditions as a trio, because they were the only members of the band that were able to participate in the process. After their auditions aired on TV, the band solidified as a trio. Moore stood out as he is Caucasian and spoke only a little Korean.

Participation in Superstar K3 
Busker Busker auditioned for the third season of the survival audition show Superstar K. They were eliminated after performing the song "Juliette" with another auditioning group, Togeworl. However, despite only making it to the Top 48 of tryout contestants, it happened that Yeri Band, originally in the Top 10, dropped out. As a result, Busker Busker, along with another band (Haze), were given a second chance to appear on the TV show and signed on to be a part of the show's new Top 11. Busker Busker's first song on the show, "Tokyo Girl", was extremely popular and the band survived the first elimination round as well as achieved their first chart-topping release. After repeating their previous success, the band managed to avoid elimination. Eventually, only the last three groups remained which included Busker Busker, Ulala Session, and Togeworl. Going into the second-to-last show, the three groups were asked to honor a promise they had made earlier on the show, that if they were to end up in the Top 3 of Superstar K3, they would strip dance. They performed in Hongdae in front of a group of onlookers. After the live performances of the second-to-last show, and the live voting was completed, it was determined that Busker Busker and Ulala Session were to be the final two groups remaining. The last episode of the season was the final competition between the two remaining groups, with Ulala Session taking the top place.

Busker Busker 1st Album and Busker Busker 1st Wrap Up Album (2012) 

After the completion of Superstar K3, the group had been highly elusive and took time off from public activities to determine their music direction, in part due to the difficulty the band had practicing. In addition, while the band was scheduled to take part in a Superstar K3 Top 11 Concert Tour, Moore returned home for the Christmas holidays. As a result, the band temporarily found a new drummer for the concert while Moore traveled to America. After Moore returned on January 12, the band resumed practices in order to prepare and record their first album as a separate entity from the Superstar K3 TV show.

On March 29, 2012, Busker Busker released their first album, which was simply titled Busker Busker 1st Album. All songs on the album were written by Jang, including the lead single "Cherry Blossom Ending". The album quickly became a national sensation, with every song on the album entering the K-Pop Hot 100 and Gaon Digital Chart. The album sold over 50,000 copies during its first three weeks. On June 21, Busker Busker released Busker Busker 1st Wrap Up Album, which contained music not included in their first album. Some of the songs on this wrap up album were recorded during the first album's preparation, but they were left out as they didn't coincide with the album's spring theme. After their "Youth Bus" encore concerts on June 22 and 23, they ceased promotional activities. At the end of the year their first album sold over 136,000 copies. After their six-month contract with CJ E&M Music ended, they joined Chungchun Music.

In March 2013, "Cherry Blossom Ending" was called the "carol of spring" as it topped the music charts a year after its release. It charted for the ninth consecutive year in March 2020.

Busker Busker 2nd Album and "indefinite" hiatus
Following the great success of their first album, Busker Busker released a second album on September 25, 2013. "Love, At First" served as the album's lead single. After promotion ended for their second album, Busker Busker announced they were temporarily disbanding, putting the band in an "indefinite" hiatus. They have not been active since. Jang debuted as a solo artist in 2014, Kim started the media art studio "PigRabbit" and Moore focused on his Drum-DJ band "Brad Project".

Members
Jang Beom-june – lead vocals, guitar
Kim Hyung-tae – bass guitar, backing vocals
Brad Moore – drums, percussion

Discography

Studio albums

Extended plays

Singles

Other charted songs

Music videos

Awards

Notes

References

External links

South Korean indie rock groups
South Korean folk rock groups
Superstar K participants
South Korean buskers
MAMA Award winners
Korean Music Award winners
Musical groups disestablished in 2013
Melon Music Award winners